Dwejra Tower
 is a small watchtower in Dwejra Bay, San Lawrenz, which is on the island of Gozo in Malta. It was completed in 1652, and is part of the Lascaris towers. Today, it is in good condition and is open to the public.

It is one of four surviving coastal watchtowers in Gozo, with the others being Xlendi Tower, Mġarr ix-Xini Tower and Isopu Tower.

History
The Dwejra Tower was built in 1652 during the magistracy of Grand Master Giovanni Paolo Lascaris, and was funded by the University of Gozo. It is one of the Lascaris towers, and the intention behind its construction was for it to act as a watchtower and guard the surrounding areas from corsair landings. This tower, just like the other towers, could communicate to nearby defence fortifications through fire and smoke, at night and day respectively. The expenses for running the tower were covered by producing salt from the salt pans near it. It was equipped with three 6-pounder guns in the eighteenth century. In 1744, Grand Master Pinto made going to the Fungus Rock illegal because a fungus which grew there was believed to have medicinal powers, and Dwejra Tower was used as a lookout to prevent anyone climbing on the islet.

The tower was manned by the Royal Malta Fencible Artillery between 1839 and 1873. It was then abandoned until 1914, during the time of the First World War, when the King's Own Malta Regiment and the Royal Malta Artillery were dispatched and it was manned by No. 3 Company with two (later four) 12-pounder guns. It was again used in World War II as an observation post, and on the 27th March 1943, Captain Frank Debono and Carmelo Zahra, who were stationed there, rescued an RAF pilot who had crash-landed his Mark Vb Spitfire on the cliffs overlooking the bay.

The tower was leased to Gerald de Trafford in 1956. It was passed on loan to Din l-Art Ħelwa in a state of complete dilapidation.

Present day

The tower was restored by Din l-Art Ħelwa between 1997 and 1999. It is now in good condition and is open to the public at no charge.

In popular culture
Dwejra Tower was used in the filming of the 1963 film Treasure in Malta and the 1985 film Among Wolves.

References
 From RAF Operations Record Book RAF 1435 Squadron (National Archives, UK Ref AIR 27/2342)

External links

National Inventory of the Cultural Property of the Maltese Islands

Lascaris towers
Towers completed in 1652
San Lawrenz
National Inventory of the Cultural Property of the Maltese Islands
1652 establishments in Malta